DD Rajasthan is a state-owned TV channel telecasting from Doordarshan Kendra Rajasthan. It is to be revamped as  DD Aravali soon. The proposed DD Aravali Channel will be telecasted from DDK Jaipur. It will be 24 hours channel and will be available on DTH and Cable Networks.

History
On 1 August 1975, the first television broadcast was viewed by the people of Rajasthan under the Satellite Instructional Television Experiment targeting the districts of Kota, Sawai Madhopur and Jaipur.

Doordarshan Kendra in Jaipur was set up on 1 June 1987 at Jhalana Doongri and transmission started on 6 July 1987. Initially only 30 minutes of programming produced by this Kendra and this was gradually increased. Presently the Kendra originates about four hours of programming daily.

The channel covers 79% by population and 72% by area of Rajasthan.

See also
 List of programs broadcast by DD National
 All India Radio
 Ministry of Information and Broadcasting
 DD Direct Plus
 List of South Asian television channels by country

References

External links
 Doordarshan Official Internet site

Doordarshan
Foreign television channels broadcasting in the United Kingdom
Television channels and stations established in 1992
Direct broadcast satellite services
Indian direct broadcast satellite services
Mass media in Rajasthan